Miles Alfred "Bob" Sellers (23 February 1905 – 10 September 1971) was an Australian rules footballer who played with Hawthorn in the Victorian Football League (VFL).

Early life
The eldest child of Alfred Thomas Sellers (1875–1923) and Florence Sellers (1878–1962), nee Pearce, Miles Alfred Sellers was born at St Kilda on 23 February 1905.

Football
After commencing his football career with Ferntree Gully
he joined Box Hill for a season before playing with Hawthorn from their inaugural VFL season in 1925 until 1934, as a follower and forward. He made a total of 98 league appearances. 

Sellers also played district cricket for the Hawthorn-East Melbourne club.

In 1944 Sellers returned to the VFL as a goal umpire and officiated in 131 games. Until Mark Fraser's umpiring debut in 2005, Sellers was the last former player to officiate in a league fixture. 

Miles Sellers remained an active member of the Hawthorn Football Club throughout his life, receiving a Life Membership and remaining timekeeper for the club until his death.

Honours and achievements 
Individual
 Hawthorn best all rounder: 1928
 Hawthorn Hall of Fame

Death
Miles Sellers died after an illness at St Vincent's Hospital in Fitzroy on 10 September 1971 and was cremated at Springvale Botanical Cemetery.

References

1905 births
Australian rules footballers from Melbourne
Hawthorn Football Club players
Box Hill Football Club players
Australian Football League umpires
1971 deaths
People from St Kilda, Victoria